Nasim-ul-Ghani (born 14 May 1941) is a former Pakistani cricketer who played in 29 Test matches and one One Day International between 1958 and 1973. At the time of his debut, aged 16 years, he was the world's youngest Test player.

He became the first nightwatchman to score a century when he hit 101 against England at Lord's in 1962.  This was his only century in Test cricket, and it was also the first century by a Pakistani in England.

A slow left-arm bowler, Nasim-ul-Ghani is the youngest person to take five wickets in a Test innings. He was aged 16 years 303 days when he took 5 for 116 against West Indies in 1958.

Nasim later played Minor County cricket for Staffordshire from 1969 to 1978.

Post-retirement
He has served as national selector and as an ICC Match Referee in two Test Matches and 9 ODIs.

References

External links

1941 births
Living people
Pakistani cricketers
Pakistan Test cricketers
Pakistan One Day International cricketers
Karachi cricketers
National Bank of Pakistan cricketers
Staffordshire cricketers
Minor Counties cricketers
International Cavaliers cricketers
Karachi B cricketers
Karachi Blues cricketers
Karachi University cricketers
Karachi A cricketers
Karachi Whites cricketers
Cricketers from Dhaka
Pakistan Universities cricketers
Public Works Department cricketers
East Pakistan cricketers
Central Zone (Pakistan) cricketers
South Zone (Pakistan) cricketers
North Zone (Pakistan) cricketers
Cricketers from Delhi
Cricket match referees